Kaseran Pillay (born 5 January 1976), is a South African actor and stand-up comedian. He is best known for his roles in the popular serials and films Blitzpatrollie, Mayfair and I Am All Girls. Apart from acting, he is also a MC, stand-up comedian, voice artist, director and writer.

Career
He started to perform stand-up comedy since 1997 mainly at corporate functions. Then he joined the theater productions and performed in the stage plays such as Snow White and Several Dwarfs, Hamlet, My Cousing Brother and Abbamaniacs.

In 2005, he appeared in the SABC3 travel series Going Nowhere Slowly. With the show became popular, he continued to play the role until 2007 as a regular cast. From 2005 to 2006, he worked as a Durban field presenter for the e.tv entertainment show The Showbiz Report. Meanwhile, he played several drama to comedic roles in the television serials: Bay of Plenty (2007), The History of Bunny Chow from Uhuru Productions (2005-2007) and Innocent Times in 2008. In October in the same year, he played the role of 'Ricky' in the SABC2 comedy series On the Couch.

In 2008, he made his film debut with the supportive role 'Kunji Balanadin' in the international blockbuster Mr. Bones 2: Back from the Past. Then he played the role 'Deshi Naidoo' in the Blitzpatrollie in 2013. In the same year, he made a supportive role in the film Shotgun Garfunkel. In 2017, he appeared in the critically acclaimed biographical film Kalushi: The story of Solomon Mahlangu with a supportive role 'Dawood'.

Filmography

References

External links
 

Living people
South African male television actors
1976 births
South African male film actors
People from Johannesburg
South African male stage actors
South African stand-up comedians